Lutheran High School in the capital of the U.S. state of Illinois, Springfield, is a private, Lutheran high school that was founded in 1978. The school is accredited by the Illinois State Board of Education and the National Lutheran School Accreditation. As of the 2005-06 school year, the school had an enrollment of 197 students and 70.8 classroom teachers (on a FTE ) basis, for a student-teacher ratio of 18.3.

Athletics
Lutheran High School is a member of the Illinois High School Association.  Their mascot is the Crusader.

References

External links
Lutheran High School - Springfield, Illinois

Secondary schools affiliated with the Lutheran Church–Missouri Synod
Private high schools in Illinois
Educational institutions established in 1978
Schools in Springfield, Illinois
1978 establishments in Illinois
Lutheran schools in Illinois